Tyler Davis may refer to:

 Robert Tyler Davis (1904–1978), American art historian
 Tyler Davis Bingham (born c. 1947), American member of the Aryan Brotherhood prison gang
 Tyler Davis (placekicker) (born 1994), American football player
 Tyler Davis (tight end) (born 1997), American football player
 Tyler Davis (basketball) (born 1997), American basketball player
 Tyler Davis (defensive lineman) (born 2000), American football player
 Tyler Watkins Davis, American arrested for involvement in violence at the Unite the Right rally in Charlottesville, Virginia, in August 2017

See also
 Tyler David (born 1994), American professional soccer player
 Taylor Davis (disambiguation)